Simone Böhme Kristensen (born 17 August 1991) is a Danish female handballer for Kastamonu and the Danish national team.

International honours
EHF Champions League:
Bronze Medalist: 2017
EHF Cup:
Winner: 2010, 2019

References

External links

Danish female handball players
1991 births
Living people
People from Randers Municipality
Expatriate handball players
Danish expatriate sportspeople in Romania
Danish expatriate sportspeople in Hungary
Viborg HK players
Siófok KC players
Sportspeople from the Central Denmark Region